Young Harris (1812–1894) was an American lawyer, politician, philanthropist.

Young Harris may also refer to:
Young Harris, Georgia, a town in Towns County, Georgia
Young Harris College, a private college in Young Harris, Georgia